Debbie Wosskow OBE is a British entrepreneur who lives in London, UK. She is the former CEO of Love Home Swap, a subscription-based home exchange business, which she sold for $53m to Wyndham Destination Networks in July 2017. Debbie co-founded AllBright, a club and community that celebrates and connects women at work. Wosskow is also an influential advocate of the sharing economy and is the former Chair of Sharing Economy UK. In 2015 she led the independent government review ‘Unlocking the Sharing Economy’ - also known as the Wosskow Report.  She is a Member of the Mayor of London's Business Advisory Board and sits on the Board of the Women’s Fiction Prize. In 2016, she was awarded an OBE for services to business.

Early life 
Wosskow was born in Sheffield, South Yorkshire in 1974. Wosskow’s father ran his own law firm and her mother owned a printing and packaging business. When she was 15, Wosskow won a Young Enterprise award for a business that sold scrunchies. Wosskow read Philosophy and Theology at the University of Oxford, before completing an MA. Her first job after university was at Oliver Wyman, an American management consultancy firm.

Entrepreneurial success 
By the age of 25 Wosskow had co-founded Mantra PR with Lawrence Dore. In 2001 she was selected as one of Management Today’s 35 Women Under 35, while Mantra was sold to the Loewy Group for several million dollars in 2007. In 2008 Wosskow co-founded Maidthorn Partners, an investment and advisory firm aimed particularly at assisting media and tech companies.

In 2011 Wosskow launched Love Home Swap, which is now the world’s leading home-swapping platform. After an unsatisfactory hotel-based holiday with her two young children, Wosskow watched The Holiday, starring Kate Winslet and Cameron Diaz, and was inspired to create a business that would enable subscribers from across the world to exchange their homes. An investment of £7.5m from Wyndham Worldwide, along with the acquisition of 1stHomeExchange and HomeForExchange, have helped Love Home Swap to grow exponentially – its website now features more than 100,000 homes from 150 countries.

In 2017 Wosskow sold Love Home Swap to Wyndham for $53 million.

Supporting female entrepreneurs and AllBright 
As an Angel Investor, Wosskow has frequently backed female-founded companies and is outspoken about the need to improve gender imbalances in entrepreneurial activity as a way of creating greater equality and unlocking new sources of economic growth. In 2018, she teamed up with Anna Jones, then CEO of Hearst Magazines, UK, to co-found AllBright, an education and networking organisation designed to provide a platform, skills and connections to working women across the UK. AllBright comprises Members’ clubs, Academy and Live Events to celebrate and connect working women.

Advocate of the sharing economy 
In 2014 the British government commissioned Wosskow to compile a 60,000-word report, entitled ‘Unlocking the Sharing Economy,’ for the Department for Business, Innovation and Skills.

In 2016 Wosskow launched Sharing Economy UK, “a self-appointed and member-funded trade body” that seeks “to support and monitor businesses working within the nascent industry”.  SEUK’s members include Airbnb, Zipcar and Liftshare. As chair of SEUK Wosskow is also working with Oxford University and PricewaterhouseCoopers to develop the world’s first trustmark for the sharing economy.

Wosskow also currently sits on the Mayor of London's Business Advisory Board.

References 

1974 births
Living people
Women chief executives
British chief executives
Alumni of New College, Oxford
Officers of the Order of the British Empire
Businesspeople from Sheffield